Kimiidera Park is a multi-use stadium in Wakayama, Japan.  It is currently used mostly for football matches as well as athletics events.  The stadium holds 20,000 people.

External links 

Football venues in Japan
Baseball venues in Japan
Athletics (track and field) venues in Japan
Tennis venues in Japan
Sports venues in Wakayama Prefecture
Wakayama (city)